Nattaruja Muthtanawech (born 21 August 1996) is a Thai footballer who plays as a goalkeeper for Taiwan Mulan Football League club Taichung Blue Whale. She has been a member of the Thailand women's national team.

References

1996 births
Living people
Women's association football goalkeepers
Nattaruja Muthtanawech
Nattaruja Muthtanawech